The MCW Metroliner was a coach built by Metro Cammell Weymann (MCW) in the 1980s. The Metroliner was available as a standard single-deck coach, or the more numerous and striking tri-axle double-deck coach.

The Metroliner saw service in the UK with nationalised operators National Bus Company (NBC) and Scottish Bus Group (SBG) for their long-distance coach National Express  and Scottish Citylink express services, as well as with competing operators such as Tyne & Wear PTE's Armstrong Galley Clipper service and the London Buses/West Midland Travel London Liner joint operation.  Others saw operation with NBC subsidiaries' commuter coach operations, such as the short-lived Kentish Express of Kentish Bus, Alder Valley and the Oxford Bus Company's Oxford Citylink.

Few Metroliners were purchased for touring or private hire work, although many were used for such duties after retiring from express duties.  Due to the limited demand for older double deck coaches and the high seating capacity on the upper deck, many double-deck Metroliner DR130s were converted to open-top buses by Ensignbus, for use on their London Pride Sightseeing operation, latterly passing to The Original Tour.

Variants and Production Numbers
A total of 172 Metroliners were built, in four different variants.

CR126
Only 21 of the original style of single deck Metroliner were built in 1983–84, 15 for NBC (East Kent and Eastern National), 4 for SBG (Eastern Scottish and Northern Scottish) and 2 for Strathclyde PTE.  The final ten had a revised front with less angular styling.

DR130
The most numerous type of Metroliner was the early double deck DR130 design.  This was designed specifically for UK express services and thus differed from contemporary double deck coaches in its height.  Most such coaches are under 4m in height as this is the maximum permitted in continental Europe, but this severely limits the interior headroom.  The DR130 was higher, allowing a much more spacious interior, but making the design unsuitable for continental tours and limiting its appeal on the secondhand market.

Some 127 Metroliner DR130s were built in 1983–87, for NBC (102, for numerous subsidiaries), SBG (12 for Eastern Scottish, Northern Scottish and Western Scottish) including the prototype after its use as a demonstrator, Tyne & Wear PTE (6), London Buses (4) and WMT Central Coachways (3).

HR131
Sometimes known as the Hiliner or Metro-Hiliner, the single deck HR131 featured a higher floor than the original CR126 model.  All were built with the revised frontal styling of the later CR126s.  Sales amounted to 21 which were built in 1983–88.  The first vehicle was retained by MCW as a demonstrator, whilst original owners for the others were SBG (7 for Northern Scottish), NBC (6 for East Kent, East Midland and Wessex), Premier Travel (4),  Grampian (2), and WMT Central Coachways (1).

DR140
In an effort to broaden the appeal of the double deck coach a 4m high version was offered, with sleeker styling.  Known as the Metroliner 400GT this was the rarest variant with only three examples built in 1987–88.  Two went to Central Coachways, one of which had initially been a demonstrator, whilst Yorkshire Traction took the third.

Gallery

See also 

 List of buses

References

External links
Fotopic Gallery of Double Deck Metroliners
Fotopic Gallery of Single Deck Metroliners
 for MCW production list with original owners

Coaches (bus)
Double-decker buses